At a Distance, Spring Is Green is a 2021 South Korean television series adapted from the webtoon of the same name. It aired on Mondays and Tuesdays at 21:30 (KST) from June 14 to July 20, 2021 on KBS2. It is available to stream internationally on Viki and iQiyi (exclusively for South Eastern Asian regions).

At a Distance, Spring Is Green is a coming of age, campus story about youth in their 20s whose lives appear to be like the beauty of spring from afar but cold and harsh when viewed up close.

Synopsis 

The story centers around Yeo Jun (Park Ji-hoon) a freshman at Myeongil University. Yeo Jun appears to have everything together, he's good-looking, loved by his peers, has a charming personality, comes from a wealthy family, and lives up to the expectations set for him. All isn't as appears to be as he has another side of his life he cannot show anyone and a lot of pain he must keep buried inside.

During a group project, he meets Nam Soo-hyun (Bae In-hyuk), a 3rd year in his department who is a straight-A student but a social outcast with a thorny personality. Coming from a poor family, Soohyun is only concerned with earning school credits and money to support his family. He doesn't have time for friends and even less time for spoiled, rich kids but Yeo Jun takes a strong, puppy-dog liking to him anyway and the two personalities who should mix like oil and water gradually form a close bond as they take care of each other's pain and shortcomings. Another 3rd year, Kim So-bin (Kang Min-ah) who is fairly average in everything and struggles to stand out enters the fold, and the three form an unlikely, strange trio.

Cast

Main 
Park Ji-hoon as Yeo Jun
 Seo Woo-jin as young Yeo Jun

The handsome second son of a wealthy family, he is a first-year business student at Myeongil university. He is a person that appears to have everything beautiful in life. He comes from wealth, recently got into a prestigious university, and is loved by his peers everywhere he goes because of his good looks, charming personality, and great social skills. The epitome of a social insider. However, he has a painful scar behind his bright mask. He takes an interest in Nam Soohyun, a senior in his department and from their unlikely friendship and chemistry, he gradually begins to reveal his true self and further builds relationships with those around him.

Kang Min-ah as Kim So-bin

 A 3rd year in the business department of Myeongil university. She's a social outsider who is conscious of what others think and is very timid and ordinary. Her grades and family status are all mediocre so she struggles to stand out. She's very hard working but is often disappointed in the results as they don't match her efforts. Since childhood, she's been in unrequited love with her hard-to-hate playboy friend Hong Chanki. She meets Yeo Jun, a popular freshman in her department, and they began a strange and confusing relationship.

Bae In-hyuk as Nam Soo-hyun A 3rd year at Myeongil University. A cold and cynical perfectionist who gets into confrontations, big and small, with the people around him. His father died when he was young and his mother is sick so he works part-time to support his family including his little brother. He voluntarily closed his heart to others and became an outsider who doesn't make time for friends. Then he meets Yeo Jun, an insider he should clash with but becomes very close to in their shared pain and unlikely chemistry.

Supporting 
Kwon Eun-bin as Wang Young-ran
Campus Girl Crush and 4th year in Physical Education at Myeongil University. With her charisma and easy-going personality from birth, she plays the role of the queen of the dormitory at Myeongil University. Though she seems to be cool and tough, her oldest friend, Nam Soo-Hyun knows the secret of her real worries in the corner of her heart that she struggles to express. She's had a crush on Soohyun that she's hidden for a long time but complications arise when her roommate Gong Mijoo enters the picture.

 as Gong Mi-joo

A striking and colorful beauty who is majoring in Design at Myeongil University. She grew up under her 'daughter fool' father's extraordinary love and overprotection. Because of her beauty, she's treated like a princess everywhere she goes but doesn't know how to treat others well so her relationships never last long. As Kim So-bin and Wang Young-ran's roommate, her prickly, sensitive, and arrogant personality makes troubles big and small. Though she comes off as selfish and coy, what she truly desires is finding her real self and true love. She eventually lays eyes on Nam Soohyun.

Choi Jung-woo as Hong Chan-Ki

A playboy and vitamin with bright, positive energy. He is majoring in Computer Science at Myeongil University. The best chef at Myeongil University though he talks too much. He appears to be very carefree but often feels empty inside and has his own worries he tries to hide. He is the only child of two civil servants in The Ministry of Economy. He easily gets good grades though he doesn't study at all, just soulless memorization. Lives across from Yeo Jun's dorm. He has been Kim Sobin's good friend since childhood but has never flirted with her or seen her as more than a friend. 
Lee Woo-je as Han Jung-ho

A 3rd year in Business Administration. After being discharged from the military, he returned to school late so his grades were higher than those of his fellow 3rd years. He doesn't try but hates to lose. The type of person who believes in age seniority and wants to be treated with that respect. Cries whenever his juniors have the slightest objection to his arguments and opinions. Hangs out with few of his classmates but clings to Yeo Jun because he's rich, kind, and brings snacks.
Yoo In-soo as Oh Chun-gook

A 3rd year of Business Administration who likes to gossip and spread rumors. Jungho's best friend and junior. He's weak against the strong but very strong against the weak. The fox next to the tiger.

Yoon Jung-hoon as Ko Sang-tae

A freshman in Business Administration who went to high school with Yeo Jun and is now also his college classmate. Though he hangs around Yeo Jun, he is actually jealous of him.

 as Park Hye-ji

A 3rd year in Business Administration who likes to hang out but has a double-faced attitude. She discriminates against others based on money, appearance, and education. She tries to get along with the popular freshman, Yeo Jun but things don't go well. Becomes jealous of Kim Sobin because she gets close to Yeo Jun and tries to interfere.

 as Lee Gi-sun

A 3rd year in Business Administration and Hyeji's best friend. She doesn't approve of her friend's discriminatory behavior but listens to her and completes her difficult requests.

Bin Chan-wook as Park Jung-bum

A 4th year in Business Administration and a brazen liar. He is a working scholarship student in the teaching school and Business Administration department office. He is jealous of Kim Sobin, whom Assistant Seol likes. He's ambitious and wants to gain favor with Professor Song.

Cha Chung-hwa as Professor Song

Professor of Business Administration at Myongil University, she is an authoritarian. Cold and rational. She doesn't understand Professor Park who wants to get along with students. Believes school is a battlefield of competition not a playground of romance.

Eru as Professor Park

Professor of Business Administration at Myongil University. A true professor of this era who truly loves students. He dreams of being a Maverick teacher like Keating in Dead Poets Society It is a small dream to eat with students and talk about life candidly.

 as assistant Seol
An assistant in the Department of Business Administration at Myongil University, and a person who is close to her juniors with a sociable style and supports them. She feels sorry for Kim Sobin and tries to help her as she walks alone. Gets angry sometimes at Professor Song because of her savagery but is patient.

Yeo Jun's family 
Na In-woo as Yeo Jun-wan
 Choi Seung-hoon as young Yeo Jun-wan

Yeo Jun's older brother who is in charge of him and the youngest professor at Myeongil University. A genius who understood calculus at the age of 6 and was reading mathematics papers at foreign universities by age 12. He's lived the life his parents wanted without a single mistake. He is an FM personality who doesn't express emotions and is very rational in his decisions, words, and actions. He carries a lot of darkness and unhappiness despite having wealth and honor. He does not feel any meaning in his accomplishments as the youngest person with a doctor title in Korea, youngest full-time professor, etc.

  as Yeo Myeong-hoon

Yeo Jun and Yeo Jun-wan's dad. President of Mijin Foods, a large conglomerate. A successful and elite businessman who came from an ordinary family but joined a large company and climbed his way up to where he is today. He is a competitive workaholic who doesn't take days off. Believes that people who cannot stand out in a satisfactory way hold no value.

So Hee-jung as Cha Jung-joo

Yeo Jun and Yeo Jun-wan's mom. A musician who graduated with her degree and planned to study abroad but due to family pressure was forced to give up her dream and get married. She carries a lot of complex and intense anger inside. All the friends she went to school with are now successful music professors and famous musicians while she's just a Mijin Foods wife. She tried her best to raise her two sons, Joon and Joonwan but is a cold woman with stronger self-love than motherly love.

Nam Soo-hyun family 
 as Nam Gu-hyeon

Nam Soo-hyun's younger brother. A student studying for his civil service exam because he wants to become a police officer just like his (deceased) father. Is not fully aware of the burden Soohyun carries financially. An immature younger brother who has to do what he wants.

Others 
 Han Soo-ah as Chan-ki's girlfriend

Original soundtrack

Part 1

Part 2

Part 3

Ratings

 In this table,  represent the lowest ratings and  represent the highest ratings.

References

External links
  
 
 
 At A Distance, Spring Is Green at Daum 
 At A Distance, Spring Is Green at Daum Webtoon 

Korean-language television shows
Korean Broadcasting System television dramas
2021 South Korean television series debuts
2021 South Korean television series endings
2020s college television series
South Korean college television series
South Korean romance television series
Television productions suspended due to the COVID-19 pandemic
Television series by Victory Contents